The following is a list of the 21 cantons of the Yvelines department, in France, following the French canton reorganisation which came into effect in March 2015:

 Aubergenville
 Bonnières-sur-Seine
 Chatou
 Le Chesnay-Rocquencourt
 Conflans-Sainte-Honorine
 Houilles
 Limay
 Mantes-la-Jolie
 Maurepas
 Montigny-le-Bretonneux
 Les Mureaux
 Plaisir
 Poissy
 Rambouillet
 Saint-Cyr-l'École
 Saint-Germain-en-Laye
 Sartrouville
 Trappes
 Verneuil-sur-Seine
 Versailles-1
 Versailles-2

References